The  Chrysler Valiant (VK) is an automobile which was produced by Chrysler Australia from October 1975 to October 1976. It was the eleventh Australian produced Chrysler Valiant series.

Overview
The Chrysler Valiant VK series was introduced in October 1975, replacing the Valiant VJ series. The VK was essentially a facelift of the VJ with revised grilles, taillights and badging. The VK was intended to have significantly different styling to the VJ, however this did not eventuate due to financial constraints.

The range was rationalized with a reduced number of models and options. The Chrysler name was now promoted more strongly with Chrysler badging displayed prominently on the new models. The Charger was now known as the Chrysler Charger, having previously been promoted as the Valiant Charger by Chrysler.

The six cylinder engines were fitted with a new Carter carburetor. A vacuum operated “Fuel Pacer” was offered as an option, the device using a flashing light to assist the driver in avoiding fuel wastage. This light was initially on the right-hand guard, but was later fitted to the instrument panel. Additional safety features included a pressure proportioning valve in the rear brake circuit, power-boosted brakes and hazard warning lights. Indicator, headlight dipping, headlight flashing and windscreen wiper controls were now housed in a steering column stalk. This was the first multi-purpose stalk control to be fitted by any of the “big three" manufacturers, the other two being Ford Australia and General Motors-Holden's.

Model range
The VK series was offered in 4-door sedan, 5-door station wagon, coupé and coupé utility body styles in the following models:

 Chrysler Valiant Ranger sedan
 Chrysler Valiant Ranger wagon
 Chrysler Valiant Regal sedan
 Chrysler Valiant Regal wagon
 Chrysler Charger XL
 Chrysler Charger 770
 Dodge utility

200 Charger White Knight Specials were produced, based on the Charger XL. Specified via Option Code A50, 100 examples were produced in Arctic White and 100 in Amarante Red.

Engines and transmissions
The range of engines available in the VK series comprised  I6,  I6,  I6,  V8 and  V8. 3 speed manual, 4 speed manual and 3 speed automatic transmissions were offered.

As of July 1976, the 215 and 360 engines were dropped from the lineup, to conform with ADR27A emissions requirements. The 215 was replaced by a low compression version of the 245.

Production and replacement
VK production comprised 11,722 sedans, 4,039 wagons, 1,625 Chargers and 3,169 utilities for a total of 20,555 units. This was the lowest Valiant production since the S Series. The VK was superseded by the Chrysler Valiant (CL) in November 1976.

Chrysler CK series

Chrysler Australia also produced the related Chrysler CK series, a long wheelbase, luxury model developed from the Valiant VK.
In July 1976, the 360 (5.9L) engine was dropped to meet ADR27A emissions requirements, being replaced by the 318 (5.2L) engine as standard fitment to the Chrysler, which gained colour coded hubcaps and Cloth Cord trim at the same time. The Chrysler CK was replaced by the Chrysler Regal SE in October 1976, the later being the prestige model in the newly released Chrysler Valiant (CL) range.

See also
 Chrysler Valiant
 Chrysler Valiant Charger

References

Cars of Australia
Valiant vehicles
Valiant
Cars introduced in 1975
1970s cars